The Imperatritsa Mariya-class battleships were the first dreadnoughts built for the Black Sea Fleet of the Imperial Russian Navy. All three ships were built in Nikolayev during World War I; two of the ships were built by the Rossud Dockyard and the third was built by the Associated Factories and Shipyards of Nikolayev. Two ships were delivered in 1915 and saw some combat against ex-German warships that had been 'gifted' to the Ottoman Empire, but the third was not completed until 1917 and saw no combat due to the disorder in the navy after the February Revolution earlier that year.

 was sunk by a magazine explosion in Sevastopol harbor in 1916. , having been renamed Svobodnaya Rossiya in 1917, was scuttled in Novorossiysk harbor in 1918 to prevent her from being turned over to the Germans as required by the Treaty of Brest-Litovsk. The crew of Volia, as  had been renamed in 1917, voted to turn her over to the Germans. They were only able to make one training cruise before they had to turn her over the victorious Allies in 1918 as part of the armistice terms. The British took control of her, but turned her over to the White Russians in 1920 who renamed her General Alekseyev. She only had one operable gun turret by this time and she provided some fire support for the Whites, but it was not enough. They were forced to evacuate the Crimea later that year and sailed with Wrangel's fleet to Bizerte (Tunisia) where she was interned by the French. She was eventually scrapped there during the 1930s to pay her docking fees.

Design and development
The Naval Ministry began planning a class of dreadnoughts for the Black Sea Fleet in 1910 when they learned that the Ottomans were on the verge of ordering dreadnoughts of their own from the British. This rumor proved to false, but the Russians had decided that they should continue the design process for the time when the Ottomans did procure dreadnoughts of their own. Preliminary specifications were issued on 12 August 1910 for a design based on that of the s then being built for the Baltic Fleet.  was thought to be excessive in the confined environs of the Black Sea so the new design was capable of only  which allowed more weight to be devoted to more guns or heavier armor. A main armament of a dozen  guns in four triple turrets was specified in the same 'linear' non-superfiring arrangements as the Ganguts. The sixteen  anti-torpedo boat guns of the Ganguts were replaced by twenty /55 B7 Pattern 1913 guns to counter the ever-increasing size of torpedo boats.

A design competition was announced in July 1911, but there were not many contenders. The Naval Ministry favored the design from the Russud Works and gave preliminary orders for three ships on 2 September, even before the competition was concluded in November. Russud's design was unsurprisingly selected and the government transferred designers from the government-owned Baltic Works as well as a complete set of drawings for the Gangut-class to speed up the detailed design process.

General characteristics
High-tensile steel was used throughout the hull with mild steel used only in areas that did not contribute to structural strength. The hull was subdivided by 18 transverse watertight bulkheads. The engine room was divided by two longitudinal bulkheads and a double bottom was provided.

Imperatritsa Ekaterina Velikaya was slightly larger than her half-sisters because ONZiV enlarged her in an effort to counter the usual problem Russian battleships had with weight.

Imperatritsa Mariya proved to be very bow-heavy in service and tended to ship large amounts of water through her forward casemates. The ammunition for the forward 12-inch guns was reduced from 100 to 70 rounds each while the 130 mm ammunition was reduced from 245 to 100 rounds per gun in an attempt to compensate for her trim. This did not fully cure the problem, but Imperatritsa Mariya was lost before any other changes could be implemented. This did not fully cure the problem so Volias, as she was known by then, forward pair of 130 mm guns were removed while she was fitting out. Imperatritsa Ekaterina Velikaya did not suffer from the same degree of trim by the bow by virtue of her greater size and retained her forward guns.

Propulsion
The two Russud-built ships were fitted with four Parsons-type steam turbines imported from John Brown & Company of the United Kingdom while Imperatritsa Ekaterina Velikayas turbines were built by ONZiV with technical assistance from Vickers Limited. Their designed speed was 21 knots. All of their electrical power was generated by three main Curtis 360 kilowatt turbo generators and two 200 kilowatt auxiliary units.

Armament

The main armament of the Imperatritsa Mariya-class consisted of a dozen Obukhovskii  Pattern 1907 52-caliber guns mounted in four triple turrets distributed the length of the ship. The guns were identical to those used in the Gangut-class ships, but the turrets were of a new and roomier design. The fore and aft turrets could traverse a total of 310° while the middle turrets covered an arc of 130° on each side. The guns could be depressed to −5° and elevated to 25° and could be loaded at any angle between −5° and +15°; their rate of fire was supposed to three rounds per minute up to 15° of elevation. The turrets could elevate at 3–4° per second and traverse at a rate of 3.2° per second. 100 rounds per gun were carried at full load.

The secondary armament consisted of twenty /55-caliber B7 Pattern 1913 guns mounted in casemates. They were arranged in two groups, six guns per side from the forward turret to the rear funnel and the remaining four clustered around the rear turret. Three guns per side were situated to fire ahead as that was the most likely direction of attack by torpedo boats as anticipated by the Naval General Staff. Their rate of fire ranged from five to eight rounds per minute and they were provided with 245 rounds per gun.

No anti-aircraft (AA) armament was originally planned. In October 1916, the Naval Ministry specified that four 37-caliber  guns of a new design were to be fitted, but they never entered service. The two older ships had three or four 50-caliber  Pattern 1892 guns mounted on turret roofs. The 75 mm gun had maximum elevation of 50°. Volia used four of the newer 30-caliber  'Lender' AA guns, mounted on the fore and aft turrets. This had a maximum depression of 5° and a maximum elevation of 65°.

Four underwater  torpedo tubes were also fitted, two on each broadside in a compartment immediately abaft the forward magazine. Imperatritsa Mariyas trials revealed problems with her magazine cooling systems where the heat generated by the ventilation system mostly negated the cooling effects of the refrigeration system. Her sisters shared this problem, which may have contributed to the magazine fire suffered by Imperatritsa Mariya that led to her loss in 1916.

The two older ships mounted Zeiss  rangefinders on each conning tower, but Volia was given four  Barr and Stroud rangefinders, one for each turret. These would provide data for the central artillery post to calculate, using the standard Geisler mechanical computer, and then transmit to the guns for the gun crew to follow.

Armor
The full-scale armor trials with the hulk of the old pre-dreadnought battleship  greatly affected the armor protection of the Imperatritsa Mariya-class ships. The Krupp cemented armor plates were sized to match the frames to provide support for their joints and they were locked together by a type of mortise and tenon joint to better distribute the shock of a shell's impact. Aft the belt thinned to 125 millimeters all the way to the stern. It was backed by 75 millimeters of wood to make a better fit between the hull and the armor. These thin bulkheads left the end magazines very vulnerable to shells fired from bearings in front of or behind the ship. It thinned to 75 mm forward of the casemates all the way to the bow. The casemates were also protected by a  transverse bulkhead from axial fire as well as a 25 mm screen between each casemate.

The rear conning tower also had 300 mm sides and a 250 mm support tube, but the roof was only 100 mm thick. Outside the citadel the middle deck was 37.5 mm thick and the lower deck was 25 mm thick. Underwater protection was minimal as there was only an unarmored watertight bulkhead behind the upwards extension of the double bottom.

Construction
All three ships were laid down on 30 October 1911, but this was just a ceremonial event as the design had not yet been finalized nor the contracts signed. A contract was finally signed on 13 April 1912 with Russud that specified delivery dates of 2 September 1915 for both Imperatritsa Mariya and Imperator Aleksander III. Imperatritsa Ekaterina Velikaya was built to a larger design that added over two million gold rubles to her cost and delayed the start of her construction three months after her half-sisters. Despite the demanding schedule the ships suffered from a number of delays during construction. On 10 February 1914 changes were ordered by the Naval Ministry to incorporate the lessons learned from the full-scale armor trials conducted using the Chesma. This added almost  of weight to the ships and raised their cost by 220,000–250,000 rubles. Other delays were incurred after the war began as imported components took longer to reach the shipyards and factories switched over to war production. The construction of Imperator Aleksander III was deliberately delayed in order to accelerate the completion of her two sisters and some of her turrets were transferred to Imperatritsa Mariya as well.

Service history

Imperatritsa Mariya

Imperatritsa Mariya ("Empress Maria") was launched on 19 October 1913 and arrived in Sevastopol on 13 July 1915, where she completed her fitting out during the next few months and conducted sea trials. She provided cover while the pre-dreadnought battleships conducted shore bombardment missions in October 1915. She encountered the ex-German light cruiser Midilli twice during 1916, but the cruiser escaped with nothing more than splinter damage. On 20 October 1916, she capsized and sank in Sevastopol harbor after a magazine fire and subsequent explosion. Following a complex salvage operation, she was eventually raised and placed in drydock in May 1918. However, in the chaos of the Russian Revolution and subsequent Civil War, no further repair work was done, and the ship was scrapped beginning in 1926. Her guns and their turrets, which had fallen out of the ship when she capsized, were later salvaged in 1931–1933. Two of the guns were used in the 30th Coast Defense Battery defending Sevastopol during World War II, also known as Maksim Gor'kii I by the Germans.

Imperatritsa Ekaterina Velikaya

Imperatritsa Ekaterina Velikaya ("Empress Catherine the Great") was launched on 6 June 1914 and completed on 18 October 1915. She was originally named Ekaterina II until 27 June 1915 and was renamed Svobodnaya Rossiya in 1917. She engaged the German battlecruiser SMS Goeben while the latter was in Turkish service as Yavuz Sultan Selim only once, but failed to inflict anything more severe than splinter damage. She also encountered Midilli on 16 April 1916, but the cruiser used her higher speed to escape. She was scuttled on 18 June 1918 in Novorossiysk to prevent her from being turned over to the Germans as required by the Treaty of Brest-Litovsk. No attempt was made to salvage her during the 1920s, but the 12-inch shells were salvaged from her wreck until a magazine explosion was triggered in 1930 by the explosive charges used to gain access to the shells.

Imperator Aleksander III

Imperator Aleksander III (Emperor Alexander III) was launched on 2 April 1914, renamed Volya (—Freedom) in 1917 and then General Alekseyev in 1920. The ship did not take part in operations during World War I due to long delays in the delivery of its machinery from Britain, but was able to go to sea by 1917 and conduct a series of trials. On 1 May 1918 she sailed from Sevastopol to Novorossiysk to avoid capture by advancing German troops. While at Novorossiysk she received an order to scuttle on 19 June 1918, but the majority of the crew refused to do so and decided to return to Sevastopol. Upon arrival she was disarmed and only guards were left on board, but the Germans took control on 1 October. She made a brief cruise with a German crew on 15 October, but her guns were still inoperable. After Germany's surrender she was turned over to the British, who moved her to İzmit in Turkey. In 1919 the British brought her back to the Black Sea and turned her over to the White Russian forces, where she fought in the Russian Civil War against the Red Army, mainly carrying out shore bombardments. With the collapse of the White Russian armies in Southern Russia in 1920, the battleship assisted in their evacuation to French-owned Tunisia, where she was interned in Bizerte. She was eventually scrapped there to pay her docking fees.

The French stored her guns and later donated them to the Finns during the Winter War, although they did not arrive until after the end of the war. The Germans captured four of these 12-inch and some 130 mm guns in transit in Narvik harbor when they invaded Norway in April 1940. Both the Finns and Germans used these guns as coastal artillery. The Germans emplaced all four guns, after rebuilding them to accept German ammunition, in armored turrets in 'Batterie Mirus' on Guernsey. The Finns used three of the 12-inch guns to repair railway guns that had fallen into their hands in 1941. They were used throughout the Continuation War and the Finns were forced in 1944 to surrender them to the Soviets who used them until the 1990s.

See also

 Naval warfare of World War I#Black Sea

Notes

Footnotes

Bibliography

External links

Information about the class 
Data on Imperatritsa Mariya 
Data on Imperatritsa Ekaterina Velikaya 
Data on Imperator Aleksander III 
Data on Imperator Nikolai I 
Specifications

Battleship classes
 
World War I battleships of Russia